Hollywood Senior High School was a public co-educational high day school, located in the suburb of Shenton Park in Perth, Western Australia. It was opened in 1958. It was closed in 2000 and amalgamated with another similar school, Swanbourne Senior High School, to form a new school, Shenton College.

Notable alumni
Adam Bandt - politician
Kim Beazley - former Deputy Prime Minister of Australia, former Ambassador to USA, former Governor of Western Australia
Stuart Leach - musician
Erik Locke - political figure
Alsy MacDonald - musician
Graham Moss - AFL footballer
 David Parker - politician
Louise Sauvage - paralympic wheelchair racer
Joel Quartermain - musician
Tracy Vo - television journalist

References

External links 
Hollywood Senior High School

Defunct schools in Western Australia
1958 establishments in Australia
Educational institutions established in 1958
2000 disestablishments in Australia
Educational institutions disestablished in 2000
Shenton Park, Western Australia